is a Japanese retired football player who last played for Oita Trinita.

Career
Marutani retired in December 2019.

Career statistics
Updated to 25 February 2019.

1Includes Japanese Super Cup, J. League Championship and FIFA Club World Cup.

References

External links

Profile at Oita Trinita
Profile at Sanfrecce Hiroshima

1989 births
Living people
Association football people from Tottori Prefecture
Japanese footballers
J1 League players
J2 League players
Sanfrecce Hiroshima players
Oita Trinita players
Association football midfielders